Jack Watt may refer to:

 Jack Watt (footballer, born 1890) (1890–1964), Australian rules footballer for Geelong, Melbourne and St Kilda
 Jack Watt (footballer, born 1907) (1907–1997), Australian rules footballer for Footscray
Jack Watt (actor)

See also
 Jack Watts (disambiguation)
 John Watt (disambiguation)